Prince Franciszek Lubomirski (died 1721) was a Polish noble (szlachcic).

He was the son of Court and Grand Marshal Stanisław Herakliusz Lubomirski and Elżbieta Doenhoff.

He was owner of Rzeszów, Połonne and Łańcut, and General of the Crown Army. In 1721 he committed suicide.

17th-century births
1721 deaths
Year of birth unknown
Franciszek Lubomirski
Suicides in Poland